James Grover Franciscus (January 31, 1934 – July 8, 1991) was an American actor, known for his roles in feature films and in six television series: Mr. Novak, Naked City, The Investigators, Longstreet, Doc Elliot, and Hunter.

Life and career
Franciscus was born in Clayton, Missouri, to Lorraine (née Grover) and John Allen Franciscus, who was killed during World War II when James was nine. In 1957, Franciscus received a Bachelor of Arts degree in English and theatre arts from Yale University in New Haven, Connecticut, where he graduated magna cum laude. He was a classmate of Dick Cavett and Bill Hinnant.

His first major role was as Detective Jim Halloran in the half-hour version of ABC's Naked City. Franciscus guest starred on the CBS military comedy–drama Hennesey, starring Jackie Cooper, and on the NBC drama about family conflicts in the American Civil War entitled The Americans. CBS soon cast him in the lead in the 13-week series The Investigators, which aired from October 5 to December 28, 1961. He played the insurance investigator Russ Andrews, with James Philbrook as a co-star. Franciscus was also cast in the role of Tom Grover in the 1961 episode "The Empty Heart" of the CBS anthology series The DuPont Show with June Allyson. He performed in many feature films and television programs throughout the 1960s and 1970s, preceded by a minor role in an episode of The Twilight Zone titled "Judgment Night" in 1959, and a major role in episodes of Alfred Hitchcock Presents: "Forty Detectives Later" in 1960, and "Summer Shade" in 1961.

He starred in I Passed for White (1960), and in 1963 he appeared as Mike Norris in the episode "Hang By One Hand" on the NBC medical drama about psychiatry, The Eleventh Hour. He also guest-starred on Combat!, The F.B.I. and Miracle of the White Stallions. Franciscus may be best remembered for his title roles in NBC's Mr. Novak (1963–65) and ABC's Longstreet (1971–72) which included his blind character taking martial arts lessons in Jeet Kune Do from Bruce Lee as Li Tsung in four episodes, and for his vocal performance in the movie version of Jonathan Livingston Seagull (1973). Along with Lloyd Bridges, he served as host of the syndicated real-life adventure series Waterworld, which aired from 1972 to 1975. In 1977, he starred in his fifth television series, the short-lived Hunter, as a secret agent.

He was also frequently seen in feature films of the 1960s and 1970s such as Youngblood Hawke, Snow Treasure, The Amazing Dobermans, Marooned, Beneath the Planet of the Apes, City on Fire, When Time Ran Out, The Valley of Gwangi, and The Greek Tycoon. Over the years, Franciscus found film work with Italian cinema. In 1971, he accepted the lead role in Dario Argento's second film, The Cat o' Nine Tails. In 1979, he appeared in Antonio Margheriti's Killer Fish, and in 1980 he starred in director Enzo G. Castellari's Jaws-inspired Great White (aka The Last Shark).
He continued appearing in roles on the screen and television. When less important roles were offered, Franciscus turned to writing screenplays and producing. In 1991, the year of his death, he worked as an associate producer and screenwriter on the film 29th Street starring Anthony LaPaglia and Danny Aiello; it was his final project.

Personal life

On March 28, 1960, Franciscus married Kathleen "Kitty" Wellman, the daughter of film director William A. Wellman. They had four children — Jamie, Kellie, Korie, and Jolie.

After the couple's divorce he married Carla Ankney in 1980.

They were still married at the time of Franciscus's 1991 death from emphysema in North Hollywood, California, at 57.

Filmography

Film

Television

References

External links

1934 births
1991 deaths
20th-century American male actors
American male film actors
American male television actors
Male actors from Missouri
Deaths from emphysema
People from St. Louis County, Missouri
Taft School alumni
Yale College alumni